In the 1998–99 season, the Golden Gophers had a third-place finish at the 1999 AWCHA National Championship.

Regular season
November 1998: Minnesota captured the title at the Princeton Thanksgiving tournament, with a 5-2 win over Northeastern, a 3-1 victory over host Princeton, and a 10-0 rout against Queens. Nadine Muzerall had eight points (two goals, six assists) in the three games, including a goal and three assists in the game over Northeastern. Muzerall scored that game's opening goal, as well as assisting on the game-winner. With the six assists on the weekend, Muzerall tied the tournament career assists record of 12 held by Cammi Granato. With the wins, Minnesota passed Northeastern to take fourth place in the latest U.S. College Hockey Online Women's Poll.
During that sophomore season, Erica Killewald held opponents to two or fewer goals in 23 of 26 starts and led nation in goals against average (1.24) and save percentage (.947).

Awards and honors
Erica Killewald 1999 AWCHA National Championship, All Tournament Honors
Erica Killewald, Golden Gophers most improved and most valuable player
Nadine Muzerall, USCHO.com, Offensive Player Of the Week (Week of December 1, 1998)
Nadine Muzerall, 1999 American Women's College Hockey Alliance All-Americans, Second Team
Nadine Muzerall, Second Team AWCHA All-American

References

External links
Official site

Minnesota Golden Gophers women's ice hockey seasons
Minnesota
Minn
Minne
Minne